Sivas Cumhuriyet University is a public university established in the Sivas Province of Turkey in 1973 at the 50th anniversary of Republic of Turkey. The campus is the fifth largest university campus in Turkey.

The university offers lectures, educational opportunities, cultural and sportive activities to more than 50,000 undergraduate, postgraduate and doctorate students by 2435 academic staff, cultural and sportive facilities, and libraries.

The university uses both a 0–100 point grade scale and a relative grading scale.

Academics
Cumhuriyet University accepts students to 15 faculties (comparable to colleges), 5 institutes, 13 vocational schools and 4 separate departments attached to the university presidency in the main campus.
The academic units and the programs are listed below;

Faculties and Schools and Institutes

Faculties
 Faculty of Medicine
 Faculty of Dentistry
 Faculty of Architecture: Architecture, City and Regional Planning, Interior Architecture, Landscape Architecture
 Faculty of Pharmacy
 Faculty of Engineering: Chemical Engineering, Civil Engineering, Electrical & Electronics Engineering, Environmental Engineering, Food Engineering, Geological Engineering, Geophysics Engineering, Metallurgical and Materials Engineering, Mechanical Engineering, Mining Engineering, Nanotechnology Engineering, Computer Engineering
 Faculty of Science: Biology, Chemistry, Physics, Mathematics, Molecular Biology and Genetics
 Faculty of Letters: Anthropology, Archaeology, Art History, English Language and Literature, French Language and Literature, German Language and Literature, History, Modern Turkish Dialects and Literature, Philosophy, Psychology, Social Service, Sociology, Translation and Interpretation (Tur-Eng-Fre), Turkish Language and Literature, Turkish Public Science
 Faculty of Economics and Administrative Sciences: Business Administration, Econometrics, Economics, Finance, Labour Economics and Industrial Relations, Management Information Systems, Public Administration
 Faculty of Education: Science Education, Mathematics Education, Preschool Education, Primary Education, Elementary Mathematics Education, Turkish Education, Social Sciences Education, Religious and Moral Studies Education, Music Education, Art Education, Psychological Counseling and Guidance
 Faculty of Fine Arts: Sculpture, Painting, Music Sciences, Music Technologies
 Faculty of Communication Radio-Television-Film, Journalism, Public Relations and Publicity
 Faculty of Technical Education Mechanical Education, Electronic-Computer Education
 Faculty of Health Sciences: Nursing, Midwifery, Health Administration, Physical Therapy and Rehabilitation
 Faculty of Theology
 Faculty of Veterinary Medicine
 Faculty of Sport Sciences
 Faculty of Technology Automotive engineering, Manufacturing Engineering, Mechatronic Engineering, Optical Engineering, Biomedical Engineering

Schools
 School of Physical Education and Sports
 School of Foreign Languages
 Vocational School of Foreign Health Services
 Vocational School of Sivas: It is located in the central district of Sivas.
 Vocational School of Cumhuriyet: It is located in the central district of Sivas.
 Vocational School of Divriği Nuri Demirağ: It is located in Divriği district of Sivas. The high school was established in 1987 and named after the famous Turkish industrialist Nuri Demirağ.
 Vocational School of Gürün: It is located in Gürün district of Sivas.
 Vocational School of Kangal: It is located in Kangal district of Sivas.
 Vocational School of Zara Ahmet Çuhadaroğlu: It is located in Zara district of Sivas.
 Vocational School of Yıldızeli: It is located in Yıldızeli district of Sivas.
 Vocational School of Suşehri Timur Karabal: It is located in Suşehri district of Sivas.
 Vocational School of Gemerek: It is located in Gemerek district of Sivas.
 Vocational School of Şarkışla Aşık Veysel: It is located in Şarkışla district of Sivas. The high school was established in 1994 and named after the folk poet Aşık Veysel. There is a state dormitory consisting of 4 blocks.

Institutes
 Institute of Social Sciences 
 Institute of Health Sciences 
 Institute of Applied Sciences

Counseling
University administration assigns an advisor to every class in the university. These advisors help students during the school registration and course renewals, about exams and university policies, and also personal problems.

Libraries and Computer Labs
The central library of Cumhuriyet University provides a relaxing studying environment for the students. The study halls at the capacity of 350 students, and 33 independent study rooms are currently available in the library. The collection of the library holds 50,000 journals, magazines and books. 26,000 of this collection is formed by books. Other than the central library, all of the faculties contain their own libraries, too. 
There are 30 computer labs including more than 700 computers all connected to the internet are available in the faculties and schools.

University life

Transportation
The city has all of the main transportation services such; an airport, a train station, and a bus terminal, so arrival to Sivas is easy from every location in the World. The public transportation is available between the city and the university campus in every 5 minutes, and the bus rides take about 15 minutes.

Accommodation
A dormitory managed by 'Credit and Dormitories Foundation' is serving to students in the campus area. The capacity of the dormitory is 1648 beds for females and 1152 beds for males, a total of 2790 beds. In addition, a student visitor house with 100 beds capacity is available for the students on campus. Toki houses, which are another available housing option, are in 2 kilometers distance to the university. Most of the students are being able to find housing opportunities in the center city area that is about 15 minutes bus ride to the campus.

Catering Services
One central dining hall for students and one staff dining hall for academic and administrative staff are available in the campus area. The central dining hall has the capacity to serve 5200 students at the same time.  Three courses of meal at the calorie of 1,100-1,500 are served to the students and staff during the lunchtimes. More than 1,250 academically successful and low-income students are able to receive free lunch every day.  
There are also several cafeteria and cafes available at certain locations of the campus.

Sports
Many sports facilities and activities are available for the students in the campus area. The university provides 1 half Olympic-size swimming pool, 1 gym at the capacity of 1200 students, 1 grass soccer field, 1 water sports center and many outdoor facilities settled in 60,000 square meters area. The open sports area contains 2 synthetic soccer fields, 6 tennis fields (one of them is indoors), 1 synthetic basketball court, 1 synthetic handball court, 1 mini-golf field and 6,500 square meters service area. The facilities are serving all students between 9 am and 10 pm.

Affiliations
The university is a member of the Caucasus University Association.

See also
Education in Turkey
List of Universities in Turkey

References

Sivas
Educational institutions established in 1973
Sivas Cumhuriyet University
Buildings and structures in Sivas Province
1973 establishments in Turkey
Education_in_Sivas